The March 86A, also designated as the March 86/A, was an open-wheel formula race car, designed, developed and built by British manufacturer March Engineering, for the American Racing Series (later Indy Lights), between 1986 and 1992. It was essentially a rebadged March 85B or 86B Formula 3000 chassis, using the name Wildcat, and all used identical Buick V6 engines.

References

March vehicles
Open wheel racing cars